Tevis Clyde Smith, Jr. (February 11, 1908 – December 24, 1984) was an American historian, fantasy writer, poet and amateur publisher, known for his association with Robert E. Howard. Most of his writing appeared as by Tevis Clyde Smith; he also wrote as T. C. Smith, Jr., and under his full name, Tevis Clyde Smith, Jr. He lived in Brownwood, Brown County, Texas.

Writing career
Smith self-published several chapbooks on the history, biography and genealogy of Brown County, Texas, and others of his poetry and short fiction. As a young man he collaborated on three short stories with Robert E. Howard. Late writings focused on his association with Howard.

Smith and Howard

Smith met Robert E. Howard while both attended Brownwood High School and they remained friends until Howard's death.  At the time, Smith was publishing a small amateur journal.  He and Howard collaborated on a story that was meant to run in Smith's magazine, Under the Great Tiger, though they abandoned the project.  Smith did other collaborations with Howard, one of which they sold to the magazine Oriental Stories.  Several of their collaborations were collected in Red Blades of Black Cathay, published by Donald M. Grant, Publisher, Inc. in 1971.

Bibliography

History
 Frontier's Generation : The Pioneer History of Brown County, with Sidelights on the Surrounding Territory (1931; enlarged edition 1980; reprint of 1931 edition with added index 1982)
 From the Memories of Men (1954)
 Pecan Valley Days (1956)

Biography
 Report on a Writing Man and Other Reminiscences of Robert E. Howard (1991)

Other nonfiction
 "How the Stories Came to Be" (introduction to Red Blades of Black Cathay) (1971)
 "Foreword" (to Shadow of the hun by Robert E. Howard) (1975)
 "Background to 'Questions'" (1976)
 "Foreword" (to One Who Walked Alone: Robert E. Howard, The Final Years by Novalyne Price Ellis) (1986)

Fiction
 "Red Blades of Black Cathay" (with Robert E. Howard) (short story) (1931; 1975 chapbook)
 The Cardboard God (collection) (1970)
 "Diogenes of today" (with Robert E. Howard) (short story) (1971)
 "Eighttoes makes a play" (with Robert E. Howard) (short story) (1971)
 Red Blades of Black Cathay (with Robert E. Howard) (collection) (1971)

Poetry
 Images out of the sky (1966 collection)
 Don't blame the python (1975 collection)
 "Questions (To Robert E. Howard)" (1976)
 "Rescue By a Certain Lady" (1976)

References

Sources

External links

1908 births
1984 deaths
American fantasy writers
20th-century American novelists
20th-century American historians
American male novelists
Chapbook writers
American male short story writers
20th-century American short story writers
20th-century American male writers
American male non-fiction writers